Michael Anthony Vitar (born December 21, 1978) is an American firefighter and former actor who appeared as Benjamin Franklin "Benny the Jet" Rodriguez in The Sandlot and Luis Mendoza in the final two Mighty Ducks films. He started acting at the age of 12 when a casting manager spotted him in line for a ride at a school carnival. He retired from acting after 1997.

He has two older siblings. His older brother, Pablo, played the older version of his character, Benny, in The Sandlot, after which he joined the Los Angeles Police Department in 1996. Pablo died due to colon cancer on January 29, 2008. He also has an older sister, Elizabeth.

He attended St. Francis High School in La Cañada, California, from which he graduated in 1997. Starting in 1996, he worked for Gerber Ambulance in Torrance as an EMT, from which he moved into his career as a firefighter.  Since 2002 he has been a firefighter for the Los Angeles Fire Department. He currently resides in Los Angeles.

Filmography
The Sandlot 2 (2005) - Benjamin Franklin "The Jet" Rodriguez, Flashback scene
Chicago Hope (1 episode, 1997) – Carlos Lunes
D3: The Mighty Ducks (1996) – Luis Mendoza
NYPD Blue (1996) – Teenager
D2: The Mighty Ducks (1994) – Luis Mendoza
The Sandlot (1993) – Benjamin Franklin "Benny the Jet" Rodriguez
Sunset Grill (1993) – Luis
Brooklyn Bridge (1 episode, 1991) – Anthony Gambuzza
Diplomatic Immunity (1991/I) – Arturo

Legal troubles 
On October 31, 2015, Vitar and two other firefighters confronted 22-year-old Samuel Chang, who was handing out candy in their neighborhood to trick-or-treaters. They  wrongly accused him of handing out drug-laced candy, and then chased Chang, until catching him and pinning him to the ground. Vitar and another firefighter helped pin Chang to the ground, while another held him in a chokehold until Chang fell unconscious. They performed CPR until paramedics arrived, and Chang was hospitalized for weeks. Vitar and the others were charged with felony assault. Against the will of the Chang family, Vitar was allowed to plea no contest to a reduced charge of misdemeanor battery, and was suspended without pay for six months. He has since returned to full duty.

References

External links

Vitar at Yahoo Movies

1978 births
American people of Cuban descent
Hispanic and Latino American male actors
American male film actors
American male child actors
Living people
American firefighters
Male actors from Los Angeles